Lajos Tichy (21 March 1935 – 6 January 1999), nicknamed "The Nation's Bomber", was a Hungarian footballer. He is the most prolific goalscorer in total matches in recorded history according to RSSSF with over 1912 goals scored in over 1301 matches and the most prolific goalscorer in total matches in one season in recorded history according to RSSSF with 201 goals scored in 85 matches. He played for the club Budapest Honvéd FC, scoring 247 goals in 320 league games. He also scored 51 goals in 72 internationals for the Hungary national football team, including four in the 1958 FIFA World Cup and three in the 1962 FIFA World Cup. He later became coach of the Honvéd youth team and from 1976 to 1982 he coached the first team, helping them win their first Hungarian championship in 25 years in 1980.

Career statistics

Club

International 
Hungary
 Central European International Cup: Runner-up: 1955–60

Individual 
 Central European International Cup top scorer: 1955–60

International goals
Scores and results list Hungary's goal tally first.

See also 
 List of men's footballers with 500 or more goals

References

External links
 Obituary
 Scoring Record

1935 births
1999 deaths
Footballers from Budapest
Hungarian footballers
Hungarian football managers
Budapest Honvéd FC players
Budapest Honvéd FC managers
1958 FIFA World Cup players
1962 FIFA World Cup players
1964 European Nations' Cup players
1966 FIFA World Cup players
Hungary international footballers
Nemzeti Bajnokság I players
Association football forwards
Nemzeti Bajnokság I managers